National Highway 166D, commonly referred to as NH 166D is a national highway in India. It is a secondary route of National Highway 66.  NH-166D runs in the state of Maharashtra in India.

Route 
NH166D connects Pen, Ransai and Madh in the state of Maharashtra.

Junctions  
 
  Terminal near Pen.
  Terminal near Madh.

See also 
 List of National Highways in India
 List of National Highways in India by state

References

External links 

 NH 166D on OpenStreetMap

National highways in India
National Highways in Maharashtra